Escape by Night is a 1937 American film directed by Hamilton MacFadden.

Plot summary
Members of the Capper gang rent a room from a blind man and his daughter and help them restore their farm. Another member of their gang arrives and orders their return, leading to a conflict.

Cast 
 William Hall as Nicholas "Nick" Allen
Anne Nagel as Linda Adams
Dean Jagger as James "Capper" Regan
Steffi Duna as Josephine "Jo" Elliott
Ward Bond as Peter "Spudsy" Baker
Murray Alper as Horace "Red" Graham
Charles Waldron as Pop Adams
George Meeker as Fred Peters
Wallis Clark as District Attorney Baldwin
Arthur Aylesworth as Sheriff Charlie Thornton
Anthony Warde as Mike Grayson
Bill as Bill, the guide dog

External links 

1937 films
1937 crime drama films
American crime drama films
Republic Pictures films
Films directed by Hamilton MacFadden
American black-and-white films
Films scored by William Lava
1930s English-language films
1930s American films